James Aloysius Smith (September 2, 1880 – November 9, 1944) was an American sailor serving in the United States Navy during the Boxer Rebellion who received the Medal of Honor for bravery. He was later a decorated member of the New York City Fire Department, and an early member of Rescue 1.

Early life
Smith was born September 2, 1880, in New York, and after entering the navy he was sent as a landsman to China to fight in the Boxer Rebellion.

Later life 

Medal of Honor citation
Rank and organization: Landsman, U.S. Navy. Born: 2 September 1880, New York. Accredited to: New York. G.O. No.: 55, 19 July 1901.

Citation:

In action with the relief expedition of the Allied forces in China during the battles of 13, 20, 21, and 22 June 1900. Throughout this period and in the presence of the enemy, Smith distinguished himself by meritorious conduct.

See also

List of Medal of Honor recipients for the Boxer Rebellion

References

 

1880 births
1944 deaths
Military personnel from New York (state)
United States Navy sailors
American military personnel of the Boxer Rebellion
United States Navy Medal of Honor recipients
Boxer Rebellion recipients of the Medal of Honor
New York City firefighters